Andrew Bascome is a Bermudian professional football coach who is currently the owner and head coach of USL League Two side FC Bascome Bermuda.

Career
Since 15 August 2012 he coached the Bermuda national football team together with Dennis Brown. In 2017 Bascome resigned as coach of the senior national team.

Personal life
His nephew was a player for the national team, Osagi Bascome. In December 2016 Andrew revealed that he and his brother David Bascome in their youth had been sexually abused by older players while the duo were at football academy.

References

External links

Profile at Soccerpunter.com

1963 births
Living people
Bermudian football managers
Bermuda national football team managers